The University of Delta, Agbor  is a Public University in Agbor, Delta State
The university offers undergraduate and postgraduate courses covering five faculties: Agriculture, Arts, Education, Information Technology and Law.

History
The University of Delta, Agbor was first established as a College of Education in 1979 by the former Bendel State Government and with the creation of Delta State in 1991, the school became a college owned by Delta State Government.

In January 2021, Governor Ifeanyi A Okowa of Delta State announced plans to convert College of Education, Agbor and two other schools into a full-fledged University, the bills had its first reading during plenary at the Delta State House of Assembly on the 28th day of January 2021.

In February 2021, the bill were passed into law after going through the house committee on Education.

While signing the bill which was passed by the State House Assembly, Governor Ifeanyi A Okowa said, “As the students of our technical education start to progress from the technical colleges to the polytechnics, they also have a chance of going further to the University of Science and Technology.”

See also

 List of universities in Nigeria
 List of Tertiary Institutions in Delta State
 Delta State University, Abraka
 Delta State University of Science and Technology, Ozoro
 University of Benin (Nigeria)
 Dennis Osadebe University, Asaba

References

Public universities in Nigeria
Universities and colleges in Nigeria
Education in Delta State